Lierre Keith (born 1964) is an American writer, radical feminist, food activist, and radical environmentalist.

Biography
Keith attended Brookline High School in Massachusetts. She began her public involvement in the feminist movement as the founding editor of Vanessa and Iris: A Journal for Young Feminists (1983–1985). During this same period, she also volunteered with a group called Women Against Violence Against Women in Cambridge, where she participated in educational events and protest campaigns. In 1984, she was a founding member of Minor Disturbance, a protest group against militarism from a feminist perspective. In 1986, she was a founding member of Feminists Against Pornography in Northampton, Massachusetts. She is a founding editor of Rain and Thunder, a radical feminist journal in Northampton.

As a radical feminist, and, more recently, as a radical environmentalist, Keith has had many appearances, interviews, and speeches around the U.S. and Canada.

Keith was an early public advocate of the U.S. local food movement. In a 2006 Boston Globe human interest story, she said, "I like knowing that I'm supporting the local economy, and not corporate America."

Her views have attracted negative attention from some vegetarians, what one journalist has called a "Vegan War". Illustrative of the heated political debate, protesters hit Keith with chili pepper-laced pies during a presentation of her book The Vegetarian Myth at the 2010 Bay Area Anarchist Bookfair.

The Vegetarian Myth
Keith's 2009 book The Vegetarian Myth: Food, Justice, and Sustainability is an examination of the ecological effects of agriculture and vegetarianism. In The Vegetarian Myth, she offers evidence of agriculture destroying entire eco-systems, such as the North American prairie. She also argues in favour of animal agriculture over plant agriculture, citing that the latter destroys topsoil, while animal farming rebuilds it.

Deep Green Resistance

Keith is associated with the Deep Green Resistance movement, and together with Aric McBay and Derrick Jensen, she co-wrote Deep Green Resistance: Strategy to Save the Planet, published in May 2011. The book describes itself as a "manual on how to build a resistance movement that will bring down industrial civilization and save the planet", and "evaluates strategic options for resistance, from non-violence to guerrilla warfare, and the conditions required for those options to be successful".

After the publication of this book, the authors co-founded an organization by the same name. Aric McBay left the organization at the beginning of 2012, however, attributing his departure to the cancellation of a transgender-inclusive policy by Derrick Jensen and Lierre Keith. Deep Green Resistance has disputed this account, saying that the women's safe space policy was one issue among many, and that the decision to restrict women's spaces was made by the women of DGR, and not by Jensen or Keith.

Women's Liberation Front 

Keith is a founder of the Women's Liberation Front, and, serves as its chair. Women's Liberation Front has been accused of being a hate group.

Works
"Bright Green Lies: How the Environmental Movement Lost Its Way and What We Can Do About It" by Derrick Jensen, Lierre Keith, and Max Wilbert (Monkfish Book Publishing Company). 2021.Earth at Risk: Building a Resistance Movement to Save the Planet (edited by L.K. and Derrick Jensen), PM Press, 2012, Deep Green Resistance: Strategy to Save the Planet, Seven Stories Press, 2011, The Vegetarian Myth, PM Press, 2009, Skyler Gabriel, Fighting Words Pr, 1995, Conditions of War, Fighting Words Pr, 1993, 

Notes

External links
Official website
Interview with Lierre Keith, by Aric McBay, InTheWake'', ca. 2005. (original archive copy)
Interview with Lierre Keith  by Ian McKenzie, on Why Agriculture is Destroying the Planet

American environmentalists
American women environmentalists
American feminists
American non-fiction environmental writers
Anti-pornography feminists
Anti-prostitution feminists
Critics of vegetarianism
Living people
Radical feminists
1964 births
Brookline High School alumni
21st-century American women